Harold C. Gough (31 December 1890 – 16 June 1970) was an English professional footballer who played as a goalkeeper, spending most of his career with Sheffield United and Torquay United. He made one appearance in goal for the England national team in 1921.

Club career
Harry Gough was born in Chesterfield and played for non-league sides Spital Olympic and Castleford Town before joining Bradford Park Avenue in 1910 for a fee of £30. He played three games for Bradford before returning to Castleford Town.

In 1913 he moved to Sheffield United where over the next ten years he would make 242 league appearances and win an FA Cup winners' medal in 1915. This was the last major competition before football was suspended during World War I. At the end of the war, he returned to the Bramall Lane club. A decision to become a publican in Castleford broke the conditions of his contract and he was suspended for six months in the summer of 1924. His final game for United was a 2–0 County Cup Final victory over the Wednesday.

On the completion of his suspension in December 1924, he returned to Castleford Town, before moving to Harrogate the following year from where he joined Oldham Athletic in 1926. He played four times for Oldham, moving to Bolton Wanderers in 1927, playing four league games before joining Torquay United in the summer of 1928. He immediately dislodged Archie Bayes as Torquay's first choice goalkeeper, missing just three games in his first season. He played 17 times the following season, before losing his place to Bayes through injury, and retired at the end of the season.

International career
Gough won his only full England international cap on 9 April 1921 against Scotland at Hampden Park, Scotland winning 3–0.

Honours
Sheffield United
FA Cup: Winners 1915

References

External links

1890 births
1970 deaths
Footballers from Chesterfield
Association football goalkeepers
English footballers
England international footballers
England wartime international footballers
Spital Olympic F.C. players
Castleford Town F.C. players
Bradford (Park Avenue) A.F.C. players
Sheffield United F.C. players
Harrogate Town A.F.C. players
Oldham Athletic A.F.C. players
Bolton Wanderers F.C. players
Torquay United F.C. players
English Football League players
FA Cup Final players